Kasaragod State assembly constituency is one of the 140 state legislative assembly constituencies in Kerala state in southern India.  It is also one of the 7 state legislative assembly constituencies included in the Kasaragod Lok Sabha constituency.
 As of the 2021 assembly elections, the current MLA is N. A. Nellikkunnu of IUML.

Local self governed segments
Kasaragod Niyamasabha constituency is composed of the following local self-governed segments:

{ "type": "ExternalData",  "service": "geoshape",  "ids": "Q13111219,Q16137320,Q16137823,Q13111989,Q13111177,Q20576555,Q16134778,Q16137886"}

Election history

Detailed Election Results

2021 Niyamasabha Election 
There were 2,01,812 eligible voters in Kasaragod Constituency for the 2021 Kerala Niyamasabha Election

Niyamasabha Election 2016
There were 1,88,906 eligible voters in Kasaragod Constituency for the 2016 Kerala Niyamasabha Election

Niyamasabha Election 2011
There were 1,59,289 eligible voters in Kasaragod Constituency for the 2011 Kerala Niyamasabha Election.

1952

See also
 Kasaragod
 Kasaragod district
 List of constituencies of the Kerala Legislative Assembly
 2016 Kerala Legislative Assembly election

References 

Assembly constituencies of Kerala

State assembly constituencies in Kasaragod district